20 Years of Hardcore is the singles collection album by German hard dance band Scooter, released on October 11, 2013. It collects all the singles from the band to date, plus the remix of "Maria (I Like It Loud)" from the German DJ-duo R.I.O.

Track listing

Charts

Certifications and sales

Release history

References 

Scooter (band) albums
2013 compilation albums